This Is Life with Lisa Ling is a CNN original documentary television series produced by Brooklyn-based production company Part2 Pictures and American journalist Lisa Ling, who is also the show's host. The program was announced on April 14, 2014, and its first season premiered on September 28, 2014.

On October 27, 2020, it was announced that the seventh season would premiere on November 29, 2020. Season eight premiered on October 10, 2021. It was announced that the ninth season would be its last.

Host
Lisa Ling is a writer, journalist, and former co-host of ABC's The View (1999–2002). She has been a special correspondent for CNN and the Oprah Winfrey Network, from which she brought producer Amy Bucher of Part2 Pictures to work on This Is Life.

Summary
In the investigative docuseries, the host Lisa Ling goes on a journey to the far corners of America. The premiere episode features Ling investigating the world of "sugaring" and opening up about her own relationship experience being a self-proclaimed sugar baby. Later in the first season, Ling delved into topics such as drug abuse in Utah's Mormon community, and the gay rodeo scene. The music for the first season was composed by Mike Shinoda of the band Linkin Park.

The series is largely a continuation of Ling's prior documentary series, Our America with Lisa Ling, which ran for five seasons until 2014 on OWN.

Background
This is Life was one of 12 anticipated nonfiction series to air on CNN, amid its typical daily newscasts, in 2015. The influx of these original primetime shows was part of a new initiative to "help CNN reduce its dependence on the network’s traditional format," according to a Variety article. Other nonfiction series that occupied primetime slots on CNN when her show debuted included Anthony Bourdain's Parts Unknown and a series featuring the Discovery Channel's Mike Rowe.

Celebrity writer Greg Gilman speculated that This is Life would be similar in concept to Lisa Ling's previous show, Our America. However, Ling told the Huffington Post that This is Life would be "edgier" and "much more in your face" than the last series, which aired on OWN.

Episodes

Season 1 (2014)

Season 2 (2015)

Season 3 (2016)

Season 4 (2017)

Season 5 (2018)

Season 6 (2019)

Season 7 (2020)

Season 8 (2021)

Season 9 (2022)

Awards and nominations

References

External links 

 

2014 American television series debuts
2022 American television series endings
CNN original programming
2010s American television news shows
2020s American television news shows
2010s American documentary television series
2020s American documentary television series